6-Aminoquinolyl-N-hydroxysuccinimidyl carbamate (AQC) is a fluorogenic, amine labeling dye that is not fluorescent itself, but covalently reacts with secondary amines to form a fluorescently labeled product. It has a fluorescence excitation wavelength of 250 nm (UV-C), and emission wavelength of 395 nm (deep violet, near UV).

See also
 Fluorescamine
 FQ

References

Dyes
Succinimides
Quinolines
Carbamates